Doce Fugitiva is a Portuguese telenovela, broadcast in the channel TVI. It aired from October 24, 2006 to September 16, 2007. It is a remake of the 2002 Argentine telenovela Kachorra.

Ratings
In its premiere, it was the highest rated of the day, with an average audience of 1.7 million, or 42.5%. of the viewing audience.  It remained in the top places throughout its run.

References

External links 
 

Portuguese telenovelas
2006 telenovelas
2006 Portuguese television series debuts
2007 Portuguese television series endings
Televisão Independente telenovelas
Portuguese-language telenovelas